Strange Creek may refer to:

Strange Creek (West Virginia), a stream 
Strange Creek, West Virginia, an unincorporated community